Ortaca is a town and district of Muğla Province in the Aegean region of Turkey. Formerly a township depending Köyceğiz administratively, it was made into a separate district in 1987. Apart from Ortaca district center, there is one depending township with own municipality, namely Dalyan.

Ortaca is a typical Turkish working-class town with an economy based on agriculture. It lies midway between Dalaman and Köyceğiz. Its name literally means "the town in the middle", possibly a reference to its location in the middle of the surrounding plain and is indeed a regional hub. The town pulls benefits from this fertile plain and the economy largely depends on tomatoes, citrus fruits, cotton and pomegranates. The market day is on Fridays and the whole town becomes a hive of activity worthy of a visit. A regular bus service operates between Dalaman and Dalyan via Ortaca as well as to other main coastal centers. This burgeoning town has supermarkets, shops, bars and cafes at attractive prices and is only 15 minutes from the international Dalaman Airport, 10 minutes from the marvel of the nature that is Dalyan and 20 minutes from the unspoilt beach at Sarıgerme. In line with recent policies aimed at opening the entire region to international tourism, Ortaca is growing rather fast, which is also a consequence of the rapid population growth in Turkey in general.  Ortaca is also becoming an increasingly attractive market for Foreign purchases of real estate in Turkey.

See also
 Dalyan
 Blue Cruise
 Foreign purchases of real estate in Turkey
 Lycia

References

External links
 District municipality's official website 

Populated places in Muğla Province
Turkish Riviera
Districts of Muğla Province